A karabela was a type of Polish sabre popular in the Polish–Lithuanian Commonwealth. Polish fencer Wojciech Zabłocki defines a karabela as a decorated sabre with the handle stylized as the head of a bird and an open crossguard.

Etymology
The word "" does not have well-established etymology, and different versions are suggested. 

 Zygmunt Gloger  suggests derivation from the name of the Iraqi city of Karbala, known for trade of this kind of sabres. 

 Another suggestion is that the name originated in Turkey, associated with the Turkish town Karabel, in the vicinity of Izmir, or the Karabel district in Crimea.

See also
 Kilij

References

Bibliography
 Włodzimierz Kwaśniewicz "1000 słów o broni białej i uzbrojeniu ochronnym" MON, Warszawa 1981, 
 PWN Leksykon: Wojsko, wojna, broń, Wydawnictwo Naukowe PWN, Warszawa 2001, 
 Włodzimierz Kwaśniewicz: Dzieje szabli w Polsce, Dom Wydawniczy Bellona, Warszawa 1999, 

Single-edged swords
Weapons of Poland
Turkish words and phrases
Sabres
European swords